General elections were held in Mauritania on 8 August 1971 to elect a President and National Assembly, the first time the two elections had been held together. At the time, the country was a one-party state with the Mauritanian People's Party (PPM) as the sole legal party. Its leader, incumbent President Moktar Ould Daddah, was the only candidate in the presidential election, and was re-elected unopposed to a third term in office, whilst the PPM won all 50 seats in the National Assembly election. Voter turnout for the parliamentary election was reported to be 95.6%.

Background
Mauritania came under the direct control of the French Colonial Empire during 1933. After independence on 28 November 1960, the country declared itself the Islamic Republic of Mauritania, with Ould Daddah becoming its first President. He declared the country a one-party state in 1964, and during 1965 all parties merged with the ruling Mauritanian Assembly Party to form the Mauritanian People's Party.

Results

President

National Assembly
All the Mauritanian People's Party candidates were elected unopposed.

References

External links

Mauritania
1971 in Mauritania
Presidential elections in Mauritania
One-party elections
Single-candidate elections
Elections in Mauritania
August 1971 events in Africa